Shota Rustaveli (officially known as the Shota Rustaveli Peak) is a mountain in the central part of the Greater Caucasus Mountain Range, straddling the border of Svaneti (Georgia) and Kabardino-Balkaria (Russia). Shota Rustaveli is generally considered to be the 9th highest peak of the Caucasus. The slopes of the mountain are glaciated and some of the glaciers descend well into the adjacent valleys. Its name comes from famous Georgian poet Shota Rustaveli.

References 

Mountains of Georgia (country)
Georgia (country)–Russia border
Mountains of Kabardino-Balkaria
Four-thousanders of the Caucasus